The 3rd Annual Kids' Choice Sports was held on July 14, 2016, at the Pauley Pavilion in Los Angeles, California, and was broadcast three days later on July 17. Seattle Seahawks quarterback and Super Bowl Champion Russell Wilson returned as host.

Sports Council
A Kids' Choice Sports Council was formed to "lend their expertise and experience to help inform the awards show, consult on the nominee process and give feedback on categories." 
Committee members are:
 Baron Davis (former Hornets and two-time NBA All-Star)
 Ken Griffey Jr. (former baseball outfielder and 13-time All-Star)
 Lisa Leslie (former WNBA MVP and four-time Olympic gold medal winner)
 Cal Ripken Jr. (former shortstop and third baseman for the Baltimore Orioles and 19-time All-Star)
 Deion Sanders (NFL Pro Football Hall of Famer)
 Misty May-Treanor (three-time Olympic beach volleyball gold medalist)
 Andy Elkin (Agent, Creative Artists Agency)
 Tracy Perlman (VP Entertainment Marketing and Promotions, NFL)
 Jeff Schwartz (President and Founder, Excel Sports Management)
 Jill Smoller (SVP, William Morris Endeavor)
 Leah Wilcox (VP, Talent Relations, NBA)
 Alan Zucker (SVP, IMG Clients Group)
 Michael Phelps (most decorated Olympian of all time)
 Tony Hawk (professional skateboarder)
 Zane Stoddard (VP, Entertainment Marketing and Content Development, NASCAR)

Host
Russell Wilson

Presenters

Michael Strahan
Von Miller
Cree Cicchino 
CC Sabathia
Madisyn Shipman
Nick Cannon
Tyler Toffoli
Kyrie Irving
Tony Hawk
Jagger Eaton
Jamie Anderson
Andre Drummond
Victor Espinoza
Emmanuel Sanders
Nikki Bella
Brie Bella
Cam Newton
Stephen Curry
Klay Thompson
Brandi Chastain
Rob Gronkowski
Ciara
Zendaya

Legend Award
Kobe Bryant received the 2016 Legend Award.

Nominees
Winners are highlighted in bold

Best Male Athlete
Kyle Busch (NASCAR)
Stephen Curry (NBA, Golden State Warriors)
Bryce Harper (MLB, Washington Nationals)
LeBron James (NBA, Cleveland Cavaliers)
Cam Newton (NFL, Carolina Panthers)
Cristiano Ronaldo (Real Madrid C.F. and the Portugal national team)

Best Female Athlete
Jamie Anderson (Professional snowboarder)
Elena Delle Donne (WNBA, Chicago Sky)
Lydia Ko (LPGA)
Katie Ledecky (US Swimming)
Alex Morgan (USWNST and NWSL, Orlando Pride)
Serena Williams (WTA)

Favorite Newcomer
Simone Biles (Professional Artistic Gymnast)
Taylor Fritz (ATP)
Todd Gurley (NFL, Los Angeles Rams)
Jewell Loyd (WNBA, Seattle Storm)
Karl-Anthony Towns (NBA, Minnesota Timberwolves)
Kristaps Porziņģis (NBA, New York Knicks)

Hands of Gold
Odell Beckham Jr. (NFL, New York Giants)
Antonio Brown (NFL, Pittsburgh Steelers)
Corey Crawford (NHL, Chicago Blackhawks)
Rob Gronkowski (NFL, New England Patriots)
Salvador Pérez (MLB, Kansas City Royals)
Andrelton Simmons (MLB, Los Angeles Angels)

Clutch Player of the Year
Stephen Curry (NBA, Golden State Warriors)
Kevin Durant (NBA, Oklahoma City Thunder)
James Harden (NBA, Houston Rockets)
Patrick Kane (NHL, Chicago Blackhawks)
Carli Lloyd (NWSL, Houston Dash)
Peyton Manning (NFL, Denver Broncos)

Sickest Moves
Odell Beckham Jr. (NFL, New York Giants)
Stephen Curry (NBA, Golden State Warriors)
Kyrie Irving (NBA, Cleveland Cavaliers)
Lionel Messi (FC Barcelona and Argentina national team)
Alex Ovechkin (NHL, Washington Capitals)
Russell Westbrook, (NBA, Oklahoma City Thunder)

Don't Try This at Home
Alise Post (Professional BMX Racer)
Ashley Caldwell (Professional Aerial Skier)
Danny Davis (Professional Snowboarder)
Nyjah Huston (Skateboarder)
Satoko Miyahara (Professional Figure Skater)
Ronda Rousey (UFC, MMA Fighter)

King of Swag
Antonio Brown (NFL, Pittsburgh Steelers)
Andre Iguodala (NBA, Golden State Warriors)
Von Miller (NFL, Denver Broncos)
Cam Newton (NFL, Carolina Panthers)
Cristiano Ronaldo (Soccer, Real Madrid C.F.)
Russell Westbrook (NBA, Oklahoma City Thunder)

Queen of Swag
Leticia Bufoni (Professional Skateboarder)
Swin Cash (WNBA, New York Liberty)
Misty Copeland (Ballet dancer)
Elena Delle Donne (WNBA, Chicago Sky)
Skylar Diggins (WNBA, Dallas Wings)
Caroline Wozniacki (WTA)

Best Cannon
Tom Brady (NFL, New England Patriots)
Novak Djokovic (ATP)
Bryce Harper (MLB, Washington Nationals)
Aaron Rodgers, (NFL, Green Bay Packers)
Serena Williams (WTA)
Russell Wilson (NFL, Seattle Seahawks)

Biggest Powerhouse
Prince Fielder (MLB, Texas Rangers)
Draymond Green (NBA, Golden State Warriors)
Rob Gronkowski (NFL, New England Patriots)
Holly Holm (UFC)
Von Miller (NFL, Denver Broncos)
J. J. Watt (NFL, Houston Texans)

Need for Speed
Usain Bolt (Professional Track and Field Athlete)
Billy Hamilton (MLB, Cincinnati Reds)
Candace Hill (Track and Field)
Jimmie Johnson (NASCAR)
Chloe Kim (Snowboarder)
Ted Ligety (Alpine Ski Racer)

References

External links
Nick.com's Official Kids' Choice Sports website
Nick.com's Official Kids' Choice Awards website

Sports
Kids' Choice Sports
Kids' Choice Sports
Kids' Choice Sports
Kid's Choice Sports
Kid's Choice Sports
July 2016 sports events in the United States